is a passenger railway station in the city of Tondabayashi, Osaka Prefecture, Japan, operated by the private railway company Kintetsu Railway.

Lines

Station layout
The station consists of one elevated side platform with the station building underneath.

Platforms

Adjacent stations

History
Kawanishi Station opened on August 15, 1911. It reverted to "Kawanishi Station" on April 1, 1933.

Passenger statistics
In fiscal 2018, the station was used by an average of 3830 passengers daily

Surrounding area
 Tondabayashi Municipal General Welfare Hall
Nishikiori Shrine
Kawanishi Elementary School, Tondabayashi City
Tondabayashi City Koganedai Elementary School

See also
List of railway stations in Japan

References

External links

 Kawanishi Station  

Railway stations in Japan opened in 1911
Railway stations in Osaka Prefecture
Tondabayashi, Osaka